Hiram Mills Perkins (1833-1924) was Professor of Mathematics and Astronomy at Ohio Wesleyan University and benefactor of the Perkins Telescope in the Perkins Observatory. He helped build to observatory buildings and also left an endowment for the school, and also his house was later used as a dormitory before it was sold off.

Perkins taught at the university from 1873 to 1907.

The Perkins telescope was the 3rd largest telescope in the world when it achieved first light in 1931.

The telescope was eventually moved to Lowell Observatory, and the 69-inch mirror was sent to a museum when it was replaced by a 72 inch one at that observatory.

In 1880 Perkins built a house at 235 W. William St, which was later used as a dorm by OWU.

Perkin's house survived into the 21st century, and was used as a dorm by OWU university. The home (later dorm) was located 235 W. William St. In the 2017 the school sold it off for 170,000 USD, to a developer who planned to convert it into a hotel.

See also
List of largest optical telescopes in the 20th century

References

External links
About the Perkins observatory

Perkins, Hiram
American philanthropists
Ohio Wesleyan University faculty
1833 births
1924 deaths